Nicktown is an unincorporated community in Cambria County, Pennsylvania, United States. Nicktown has a post office with ZIP code 15762, which opened on November 11, 1870.

References

Unincorporated communities in Cambria County, Pennsylvania
Unincorporated communities in Pennsylvania